The Floyd S. Chalmers Canadian Play Award was a Canadian literary award given to Canadian plays produced by any professional Canadian theatre company, and having performances in the Toronto area.

The prize had a monetary value of $25,000, and was named for benefactor Floyd Chalmers, an editor and publisher.

From the award's inception until 1980, one play was named the winner of the award, except for a tie in 1977. In 1980, the award began honouring multiple plays. That year, five winners were named. Since then, four plays normally won the award each year. In 1983, a youth theatre prize was added alongside the general theatre category.

The award was one of several arts awards created by the Chalmers family of Toronto. In 2001 the award was presented for the final time, and in 2002 the Chalmers family endowed an Ontario Arts Council fund for two arts grant programs.

Winners

References 

Awards established in 1973
1973 establishments in Ontario
Awards disestablished in 2001
2001 disestablishments in Ontario
Canadian dramatist and playwright awards